U.S. Route 129 (US 129) is a  U.S. Highway in the U.S. state of Georgia. It travels south-to-north from the Florida state line, south of Statenville, to the North Carolina state line, northwest of Blairsville.

US 129 is signed concurrently with various state highways. Most of the highway is concurrent with State Route 11  (SR 11) at both the southern and northern terminus as well as in central part of the state. However, north of Hawkinsville, and into southern Macon, the highway travels along SR 247. Within Macon itself, it travels along parts of SR 87, and later SR 49, and from Macon to Gray, it also travels along SR 22. Between Gray and Eatonton, it travels along SR 44, to the Watkinsville area along Georgia State Route 24, SR 15 Alternate from Athens to Arcade, SR 11 Connector between Arcade and Jefferson, SR 365 and then SR 369 southeast of Gainesville, and SR 180 within the Chattahoochee-Oconee National Forest

Concurrencies with U.S. Highways include US 221 through the Lakeland area, US 82 through the Alapaha area, US 319 from Ocilla to Fitzgerald, US 341 through the Hawkinsville vicinity, US 41 north of Sofkee into southern Macon, US 41 Business in Macon, US 80 in Macon, US 23 in Macon, US 441 from Eatonton to Athens, US 278 near Madison, US 29 and US 78 in Athens, US 23 again in Gainesville (unsigned with Interstate 985) and US 19 from Turners Corner through the North Carolina state line to Topton.

Route description

Florida State Line through Ray City
U.S. Route 129 begins at the Florida state line south of Statenville at the northwestern terminus of Florida State Road 100. The first intersection within the state is a local dirt road named Strickland Road. The route travels north concurrent with SR 11, and the rural surroundings that were found in northern Florida continue into Georgia. Aside from farmhouses and the fields they reside in, very little resemblance to development can be found until the routes reach downtown. A bi-directional connecting ramp can be found on the southwest corner of the intersection with Georgia State Route 94, while the county court house is on the southeast corner. Not long after this intersection, US 129 descends over the wetlands of Troublesome Creek, and curves to the northeast and re-enters farmland again. At a pair of farm fields, the road curves almost straight north. Along the way, the routes enter the community of Mayday and serves as the western terminus of Georgia State Route 187, whose intersection is shared by a local street named Norman Eva Road. Besides farms, forests and the occasional church, this segment of US 129/SR 11 passes over bridges for Cow Creek, and later Reedy Creek. The routes enter Stockton in the vicinity of Wayne Jones Honey Farm, but then approaches a railroad crossing with a CSX (formerly Atlantic Coast Line Railroad) line just before the eastbound lanes of US 84/SR 38. Shortly after this, it approaches the westbound lanes of US 84/SR 38, which has turning ramps on the northeast and northwest corners. Eventually leaving the city limits, they continue to run straight northeast until the intersection with Bennett Road, where the routes turn northwest, and even more so north of the intersection with Brantley Road. Just before the intersection with Georgia State Route 37C, the routes turn straight north again, only for the street to end at a "T" intersection with Georgia State Route 37, then turns west along SR 37, and encounters the northern terminus of SR 37C, and almost immediately has a wrong way concurrency with U.S. Route 221, which is also shared by State Routes 31 and 122.  US 129/221/SRs 11/31/37/122 cross the Captain Henry Will Jones Bridge over the Alapaha River, then crosses another bridge over a tributary to that river named "Big Creek" where it officially enters Lakeland. For such a small city, Lakeland hosts a large cluster of US and state highways, many of which intersect or overlap US 129/11. The first one is North College Street, which serves as the southern (eastern) terminus of Georgia State Route 11 Bypass and the southern terminus of a concurrency with Georgia State Route 135 Bypass. Just two blocks later the wrong-way concurrency with SR 135 Bypass ends when that route makes a left turn onto Oak Street going south. Five blocks after this it has another concurrency with Georgia State Route 135 to the right on North Carter Street, and a mere 121 feet later turns south in the opposite direction on South Valdosta Road, along with southbound US 221. A block and a half later, SR 122 branches off at a fork in the road to the southwest towards Thomasville, while US 129/SRs 11/37 branches off to the northwest. The last group of routes are the northern terminus of Georgia Connecting Route 11 at North Pecan Street and the northern (western) terminus of SR 11 Bypass at West Church Avenue. West of the city limits, one last state route can be found in the county, specifically, the Georgia State Route 122 Connector. All other intersections along US 129/SRs 11/37 are local streets or county roads. Just after the routes cross the Lanier-Berrien County Line, they intersect Johnson Street Extension, and Myers Road, then runs through the forestland surrounding Beaverdam Creek before eventually entering Ray City, where it becomes Main Street, curves almost straight west, and serves as the southwestern terminus of Georgia State Route 64. After a railroad crossing, the concurrency with Georgia State Route 37 ends as US 129/SR 11 starts curving to the north and is joined by another concurrency, this time with Georgia State Route 125.

Ray City through Pineview
The road moves away from the tracks just before entering Nashville where it is given the name South Davis Street. After the intersection with South Jefferson Street, it curves to the right and runs straight north. Two blocks later, Georgia State Route 76 joins the concurrency with US 129/SR 11/125 at the intersection of Adel Highway and Hazel Avenue. A former section of SR 76 (Adel Highway) can be seen just north of that intersection on the west side as a dead-end street. A flood channel also runs under the road where the former intersection used to exist. Further downtown, US 129/SRs 11/76/125 encounter the western terminus of Georgia State Route 168 at East McPherson Avenue. Two blocks later at the NRHP-listed Berrien County Courthouse, the concurrency with Georgia State Route 76 comes to an end as it turns east onto East Marion Avenue, while at the same intersection the concurrency with Georgia State Route 125 comes to an end as it turns west onto West Marion Avenue. From that point US 129/SR 11 becomes North Davis Street and runs through the rest of the city until passing by the Berrien Primary School and later after the intersection with North Magnolia Drive. After leaving the city, the name of the street changes from North Davis Street to Main Street, despite having none of the typical characteristics of such a street name. Instead it serves as a rural two-lane roadway passing through mostly agricultural and forested lands. It is at the intersection of West Lenox Road, which runs southwest, and a private farm road that runs southeast that the routes enter Alapaha. The road runs north-northeast within the town, and a few blocks after the intersection with East Brunswick Street, passes through the former Atlantic Coast Line Railroad right-of-way that was converted into a town green, with the station converted into a firehouse. The road passes by the post office, then the Alapaha Baptist Church, and three blocks later, turns left at US 82/SR 520 (South Georgia Parkway). The concurrency leaves the town limits, and after a local farm supply store, US 129/SR 11 branches off to the northwest onto Alapaha Highway, while US 82 heads west to Albany, Georgetown, Montgomery, Alabama, and ultimately Alamogordo, New Mexico.

Meanwhile, US 129/SR 11 passes by some local farmland along with a dirt road, then after a cemetery enters some wetlands where it makes a slight curve to another northwest angle passing by a fish farm, then curves to the right before the intersection with Berrien County Road 246, then crosses the Captain Henry Will Jones Bridge over the Alapaha River and turns back to the northeast again. At the Berrien–Irwin County Line the road intersects the western terminus of Georgia State Route 158, then north of Tulip Road (Irwin CR 80) crosses a bridge over Reedy Creek. It then turns to the north-northwest between Green Road (Irwin CR 88) and Nash Lane (Irwin CR 265), then turns straight north at Hickory Road (Irwin CR 57). North of Cedar Grove Church Road (Irwin CR 246) the road enters the Ocilla City Limits. US 129/SR 11 curves slightly to the northeast before passing by the Irwin County Detention Center, then crosses a bridge over Stump Creek, and becoming Irwin Avenue as it turns straight north before approaching the intersection with Five Bridge Road and East Boulevard, the latter of which is where Georgia State Route 90 turns from west to north in a concurrency with US 129/SR 11. US 129/SRs 11/90 run north through a mostly residential area, where it passes the Ocilla-Irwin Chamber of Commerce, and north of that the historic Irwin County Courthouse between West First and West Second Street. US 319 and Georgia SR 32 are marked at Fourth Street, where northbound US 319 leaves its concurrency with eastbound SR 32 to join US 129.

South of Valdosta Lane, US 129/319/SRs 11/90 widens to four lanes with a center left-turn lane. The routes leave the city after the Ocilla Bethel Baptist Church. Between West Cargile and East Frank Roads, signs of an abandoned railroad crossing can be found. North of Aaron Drive, the road gets the name Fitzgerald Highway and serves as the location of sites such as the Ocilla Country Club, and then the Dill's Builder's Supply, but changes its name to Ocilla Highway after crossing a bridge over Willacoochee Creek, and shortly afterwards the Irwin-Ben Hill County Line. At Pine Level Church Road (Ben Hill CR 243), the routes curve from northeast to Northwest, and intersects Ed Ward Road, which leads to the Fitzgerald Municipal Airport and later the Turkey Creek Golf Course and Country Club. The routes officially enter the City of Fitzgerald at the intersection of Georgia State Route 107 where US 319 leaves the concurrency by turning right. North of there, US 129/SRs 11/90 pass through standard contemporary commercial zoning with fast food restaurants, shopping centers, and similar businesses as it crosses a railroad line and becomes Grant Street as it curves straight north, then splits into a one-way pair, when the northbound lanes shift onto Sherman Street. Between Cypress and Palm Streets, Sherman Street runs along the west side of Blue and Gray Park. Further downtown, both streets approach Central Avenue, a divided boulevard that provides a link between the northern terminus of Georgia State Route 125 and US 319. One block later, they cross level crossings with a former Atlantic Coast Line Railroad line. North of there, the roads run over flood channels at Chattahoochee Street. Though Grant Street remains straight north of East Ohoopee Street, Sherman Street turns to the northwest where SR 90 leaves the concurrency at West Sultana Drive, and Sherman Street becomes Wilson Avenue. The one-way pair ends as both roads curve to the northeast and becomes Bowens Mill Highway, although a local segment of Wilson Avenue resumes on the Grant Street side of this pair. After passing the Fitzgerald Nursing Home the road curves north again, cutting off a former segment of Bush Road and transforming into a frontage road between Jack Allen Road and Lower Rebecca/Joshlyn Road.

North of Fitzgerald, it runs through Queensland then curves to the right and passes through Bowens Mill where it serves as the western terminus of SR 182 and replaces the trajectory of that route running roughly parallel to the Ocmulgee River even as it crosses the Ben Hill-Wilcox County Line, passing a Georgia State Fish Hatchery. Continuing in relatively close proximity to the Ocmulgee the road eventually runs through Abbeville where the street becomes South Broad Street. A long driveway leads to the Wilcox Correctional Institute, then the road curves straight north as it crosses a bridge over a former Seaboard Air Line Railroad line. Four blocks later South Broad Street ends at US 280/SR 30 (Main Street) and the road becomes North Broad Street then curves back to the northwest at Cannonville Road. Curving less to the west, it skirts through the eastern edges of Pineview where Routes 129 and 11 serves as the northern terminus of Georgia State Route 233, and then a bridge over Cedar Creek, a tributary of the Ocmulgee River, followed by an overflow bridge. At Richland Church Road, the routes cross the Wilcox-Pulaski County Line where more farmland surrounds the road than woodland. The exception were the wetlands surrounding a bridge over Bluff Creek and another over Standley Creek. Farmland is reduced slightly but continues along this segment. An abandoned former section can be found on the east side of the road as it approaches the intersection with Georgia State Route 112, which joins US 129/SR 11 in a concurrency north of here.

Hawkinsville through Macon
After the intersection with Fire Tower Road US 129/SR 11/SR 112 enters the city limits of Hawkinsville, and instantly passes alongside of the Lawrence Bennett Harness Horse Racing Training track. Further into town Abbeville Highway becomes South Jackson Street. They travel along South Jackson Street as they approach US 341/SR 27/SR 230/SR 257, where US 129/SR 11 turns left. The same intersection is also the southern terminus of US 129 Alt., which heads east and US 129 Bus., which continues northbound onto Jackson Street, while the concurrency with SR 112 ends and joins US 129 Alt. The first sites along this segment are the city hall and historic Hawkinsville Opera House. SR 27/SR 257  turns southwest onto McCormick Avenue (Fire Road 600). After Wood Street, SR 230 continues to the west onto Broad Street while US 129/US 341 Truck/SR 11 takes a sharp turn to the northwest rejoining the Golden Isles Parkway. Three blocks later, the highways encounter the first major intersection, which is SR 26. Just after the culvert over Town Creek, US 129/US 341/SR 11 mainline leaves the Hawkinsville city limits, and US 129 Bus./US 341 Bus./SR 11 Bus. ends at these highways before the main road curves to the northwest and replaces the trajectory of the business routes. The end of the concurrency with US 341 and temporary end of the concurrency with SR 11 begins when US 129 turns north onto SR 247. US 129 travels concurrently with SR 247 as they enter Houston County, and later Bibb County before passing Middle Georgia Regional Airport a short distance south-southeast of an intersection with US 41/SR 11/SR 49. The five highways later travel through Rutland as they pass over a bridge for a former Central of Georgia Railway line, and then turn north again where they encounter an interchange with Houston Avenue, a former segment of US 41/SR 11/SR 49. From that point on, the street name along this concurrency is Houston Road. Later, the highways enter some marshland which includes bridges with Tobesofkee Creek and Rocky Creek before entering Macon, where it approaches a major intersection. US 41/SR 247 branches off to the northwest onto Pio Nono Road, Houston Road becomes Houston Avenue and continues straight ahead, and US 129/SR 11/SR 49 branches off to the northeast onto Broadway, this time accompanied by US 41 Bus.

US 41 Bus./US 129/SR 11/SR 49 continuously curve toward the northeast, traveling close to the same CofG line it crossed over in Rutland until it turns straight north between Estaville Avenue and Greter Street. At the intersection with US 80/SR 22 (Eisenhower Parkway) turns from east to north joining the concurrency, while Eisenhower Parkway itself continues as an unmarked and unfinished divided highway. After the intersection with Henry Street, the highway curves to the northeast. Houston Avenue ends across from Concord Street, and US 41 Bus./US 80/US 129/SR 11/SR 22/SR 49 is renamed Martin Luther King Jr. Boulevard. The highways travel under a railroad bridge for a former CofG line just south of Ash Street. Further downtown, they intersect a four-lane divided boulevard known as Poplar Street, which used to be where US 41 Bus. turned left to leave the concurrency, then curves to the right to encounter an intersection with Mulberry Street and Fifth Street, the former of which used to be where SR 49 turned left to leave the concurrency. Today, US 41 Bus./SR 22/SR 49 all turn west onto Walnut Street, then US 129/SR 11 crosses under the current and former bridge embankments for some former Southern Railway lines. US 80/SR 87 continues northbound to cross the Otis Redding Memorial Bridge, while US 129/SR 11/SR 87 makes a left turn onto Riverside Drive, joining northbound SR 87 and traveling under the same railroad bridge that it traveled under south of the intersection. The northwest corner of this intersection also contains the Charles H. Jones Gateway Park. Three blocks after this intersection, the road travels under the bridge for SR 22 (Second Street), which only includes access from a south to east loop ramp. Rotary Park can be found across from this loop. West of First Street, a vacant lot that may or may not be part of this park can also be found. The concurrency along Riverside Drive ends at Spring Street (SR 19/SR 49) when SR 87 continues straight northwest along US 23, while northbound US 129/SR 11 turn right along Spring Street (US 23), following the routes in a wrong-way concurrency. US 23/US 129/SR 11/SR 19/SR 49 then cross the W.L. "Young" Stribling Memorial Bridge (formerly known as the Spring Street Bridge) over the Ocmulgee River, which also includes the previously-mentioned former Southern Railway line on the south side and the Ocmulgee Heritage Trail on the north side. Before approaching the interchange with I-16/SR 540, southbound US 23/SR 19 are channelized into separate lanes, along with the ramps for eastbound and westbound I-16. Northbound US 23/SR 19 (Emery Highway) join US 129/SR 11/SR 49 across from the south-to-westbound on-ramp to I-16. US 129 Alt. ends at US 129 at the intersection of Second Street, but SR 22 resumes its concurrency with US 129. Over several blocks later, SR 49 leaves the concurrency and turns east onto Shurling Drive.

Metro Macon through Athens
Still within Macon, US 129/SRs 11/22 changes from a four-lane undivided highway to a four-lane divided highway named Gray Highway. This continues even as it crosses the Bibb-Jones County Line, just north of the intersection with the southern terminus of Old Clinton Road a former segment of SR 11. That segment ends as Old Gray Highway across from Joycliff Road, and another one named Rock Cliff Road begins across from the intersection of Sand Creek Trail. After this one ends, another former SR 11 segment (Old Macon Road) begins north and across from that at the intersection of Greenwood Road. The north end of Old Macon Road and an entrance to a gated community called "Landfall at Porter" is where the routes enter Gray. From there the road curves more towards the east-northeast when it encounters the beginning of a short concurrency with Georgia State Route 18. A six-mile bypass is also under construction at this location. Closer to downtown Gray, the concurrency with SR 18 ends at Bill Conn Parkway across from Jackson Avenue. The divided highway ends in front of a Harvey's Supermarket, and the road becomes only three lanes wide, with center-left turn lane provisions. This segment remains as such until it reaches the vicinity of the grade crossing of the former Central of Georgia Railway Line. SR 11 leaves US 129 on the west side of the tracks across from the former Gray CofG railroad station, while US 129 makes a sharp left turn along the east side of the tracks at the intersection of Georgia State Route 44. SR 22 continues towards Milledgeville and Comer.

The tracks move to the left of US 129/SR 44 after Martin Luther King Jr. Drive, and the street name changes from James Street to Eatonton Highway. After passing the Gray Garden Apartments, the road curves from north-northeast to northeast and leaves the city limits just south of Industrial Boulevard, the last connecting road between SR 11 and US 129, then crosses a bridge over Wolf Creek, and encounters the Gray Bypass again. North of there the road winds through more forestland, most of which is privately owned. Within Ethridge a former section of the road branches off to the northwest at the shared intersection of Old Eatonton Road and Norman Road. From there Old Eatonton Road runs along the west side of the routes even as both roads intersect the shared intersection of Homer Chiles Road and Roosevelt Road. Old Eatonton Road ends at US 129 just north of Homer Chiles Road, but north of there another right-of-way which began at Roosevelt Road ends at US 129/SR 44 later on. It also skirts through the northern segments of Haddock where some abandoned boat repair and tackle shops can be found. The reason for the existence of such businesses is due to the parkland and wetland as it approaches the bridge over Big Cedar Creek, where US 129/SR 44 enters Putnam County, and the name of the street changes to Gray Road Southwest. This parkland Cedar Creek National Wildlife Management Area in Oconee National Forest. The first major intersection within the county is Resseaus Crossroads, which is the blinker-light intersection with Georgia State Route 212. North of that intersection it crosses a bridge over Murder Creek, and later another one named the Horace Gus Layson Memorial Bridge over the Recce Branch. Near Eatonton, the road runs along the southwest corner of a Wal-Mart Super Center, and finally approaches US Route 441/Georgia State Route 24, turning left and joining those routes in a concurrency. Continuing from Gray Road Southwest is US BUS 129/441/SR BUS 24

Throughout much of Central Georgia, US 129/441 follows SR 24 north of Eatonton, and includes an interchange with Interstate 20 at Exit 114 south of Madison. Shortly after this US 129/441/SR 24 will encounter the southern terminus of US BYP 129/441/SR BYP 24 (Madison Bypass), followed by SR 24 Spur which serves as the westbound connector to US 278/SR 12/SR 83. US 129/441/SR 24 will later join these routes in yet another concurrency, although SR 83 leaves at Washington Street. After passing by the Madison Airport, US 129/441/SR 24 leaves the concurrency with US 278/SR 12 at the north end of the Madison Bypass, and turns northeast as it crosses a bridge over a railroad line. West of another section of Oconee National Forest the concurrency runs through communities such as Apalachee, Farmington, and Bishop where it encounters the eastern terminus of Georgia State Route 186.

US 441 Business/Georgia Business Route 24 branch off to the northeast towards Watkinsville, while mainline US 129/441/SR 24 runs along the Watkinsville Bypass, which contains one intersection with New High Shoals Road, a partial cloverleaf interchange with Georgia State Route 58 near the University of North Georgia Oconee Campus, and one other intersection with a small unfinished industrial park. SR 24 ends at Georgia State Route 15 in Woodridge North as does US BUS 441/SR 24, but US 129/441 continues onto SR 15. This concurrency remains in its existing form until all three routes join the Athens Perimeter at US 29/78 (Exit 4). For a short period, the parameter is an eight-highway concurrency, consisting of US 29/US 78/US 129/US 441/SR 8/SR 10 Loop/SR 15/SR 422 (the latter of which is unsigned). Part of this concurrency ends when US 78 leaves at Exit 8. All the while the parameter gradually mores more to the northeast rather than east, as US 29 leaves at Exit 10B, when US 129/441/SR 10 Loop makes a turn on a loop ramp to the northern segment of the perimeter heading west. Evidence of a proposed eastern extension of that segment can be found east of that interchange as a stub at Old Hull Road. US 441/SR 15 leaves the concurrency at Exit 12, and US 129 leaves the Athens Perimeter at Exit 14, joining SR 15 Alt. which actually began at Exit 6.

Athens through Gainesville
After leaving the Athens Perimeter, US 129/SR 15 ALT (Jefferson Road) runs along the west side of the Athens Country Club, which it also ran along the south side of while overlapping the perimeter. As far south as the country club, US 129/SR ALT 15 is flanked by a former Seaboard Air Line Railroad (originally Gainesville Midland Railroad) line hugging along the east side occasionally curving away from it, while the road itself curves at various northwestern trajectories, occasionally running due west. In Attica, the routes encounter the eastern terminus of Georgia State Route 330 then briefly curves straight north. The road curves northwest along some large plot of farmland then northeast in front of a gas station/convenience store and the Attica Sports Complex next door. The road curves slightly to the northwest again before running under a power line right-of-way, then starts to resume its west-northwest direction just before the intersection with New Kings Bridge Road. In Arcade, SR 15 Alt. leaves at the Arcade Business Route, which was formerly part of US 129 until 2000. From here the road is overlapped by Georgia Connecting Route 11 (Jefferson Bypass) and runs almost west. After the intersection with Georgia State Route 82, it curves back to the northwest. The closest resemblance to a major intersection after this is former Georgia State Route 319 (Etheridge Road). However, Georgia State Route 11 rejoins US 129 at Winder Highway, which itself continues onto Business Route 11 leading to Downtown Jefferson. After this is an intersection with Panther Drive, which serves the Jackson County High School, and a school bus garage US 129/SR 11 then runs along a pair of bridges over the same former SAL Railroad Line that flanked it since it ran past the golf course in Athens, then intersects Holders Siding Road, which leads to the NRHP-listed Holder Plantation.

US 129 Business Route/SR 11 BUS end at US 129, which winds through the woods of Jackson County for another mile before encountering the interchange with Interstate 85 at Exit 137. The SAL line approaches the west side of the route until it reaches Pendergrass where it approaches a former segment of the road now partially designated Georgia State Route 332 which is overlapped with US 129/11 until it reaches Talmo. Shortly after the end of this concurrency, US 129/SR 19 runs through local farm fields.(lanes extended to SR 323) A second northbound lane forms after Pond Fork Church Road (Former Georgia State Route 346) as the road begins to climb a hill and make a reverse curve to the northeast, but ends just before the route cross the Jackson-Hall County Line, gaining the name Athens Highway.

The road currently widens to four lanes again just before the western terminus of Georgia State Route 323, then curves off to the northwest again, later running through Bailey. Branching off to the right is a road named Athens Street, a former section of the Athens Highway which runs northwest until it reaches Martin Luther King Junior Boulevard. US 129/SR 11 curves to the left of there and gains the additional name of "E.E. Butler Parkway." Within Gainesville, US 129 once again joins the concurrency with US 23 at Exit 22 on Interstate 985, which is also shared by the southern terminus of US BUS 129, and SR 11 leaves the overlap to follow the business route downtown. At Exit 24 US 129 leaves across from the unmarked Old Cornelia Highway, and I-985 ends, while the US 23/GA 365 concurrency continues north as an at-grade highway that has potential to be upgraded to interstate standards. In the meantime, US 129 briefly turns west along Georgia State Route 369 (Jesse Jewell Parkway), before turning right onto Limestone Parkway, and is joined by SR 11 once again. North of Georgia State Route 284 the road curves west to encounter the northern terminus of GA Business Route 11, and Cleveland Highway continues north onto US 129/SR 11, which narrows down to two lanes with a center-left turn lane running north-northwest.

Gainesville through the North Carolina State Line
Running under power lines, the surroundings become rural and increasing mountainous. Center-left turn lanes are provided almost continuously until the Old River Pointe cluster development where the road narrows down to two lanes just before the bridge over the Chattahoochee River, followed by a Georgia State Patrol station, where the center lane begins again and it takes a sharp curve to the northeast. The south side of this segment contains mostly light commercial development, while the north side, though containing one gas station is either residential or vacant. One local street leads to Little River Park After passing a cemetery, it curves to a more northerly direction before it crosses the Bells Mill Bridge over the East Fork of the Little River at Lake Lanier. Route 129 climbs around the hills of northern Hall County cutting through two former sections of the road, one of which is abandoned, and the other a local street named Indian Trail Road. Later it passes a mobile home park below an embankment and runs between two churches across from each other in Beaver Pond. The road makes a reverse turn after Honeysuckle Road, then becomes a four-lane divided highway. However, the only intersections that are served by this divided section are the shared intersection with Jim Hill Road and Nopone Road. US 129 takes a turn to the northwest and the divided section comes to an end before the road passes through Whitmire. North of the intersection with Georgia State Route 52, more local businesses identify themselves as being in the Town of Clermont, though the road doesn't officially enter the town limits until further north. Along this segment it curves to the northeast. Nearly immediately after it does though, the road has another intersection with SR 284, and merely  later another one with Georgia State Route 283. After the intersection with Georgia State Route 254, and a Shell gas station on the northeast corner, US 129/SR 11 crosses the Hall-White County line.

The route enters the City of Cleveland, just before the intersection with Donald E. Thurmond Parkway, then US 129/SR 11 curves to the northwest just before the southern terminus of the unfinished US Bypass 129, where the existing US 129/SR 11 turns right onto South Main Street. Branching on from the southeast is a street named Old Highway 75 South, where at one time a concurrency with Georgia State Route 75 began. The road makes a slight curve to the northwest at Boulevard Street, then heads straight north again at Hood Street, then passes by the White County Courthouse north of Underwood Street, while the Old White County Courthouse comes closer into the driver's view. Though seeming to terminate at Georgia State Route 115, the northbound and southbound lanes move around the former courthouse at Courthouse Square, until they reach East Jarrard Street, and the routes become North Main Street, which runs straight north until it curves away to the northwest at Church Street. The next intersection is Naccochee Road, which is unmarked Georgia State Route 75 Spur, and one block later, Georgia State Route 75, as well as the beginning of an overlap with Georgia State Route 75A The northern terminus of US Bypass 129 is proposed to end diagonally across from the intersection of Hulsey Road. East of US 129, the Cleveland Bypass is intended to continue along the north side of Hulsey Road to SR 75. Other than this the route passes by the White County High School, and an RV dealership and supply store. Georgia State Route 75A branches off to the northeast towards the Smithgall Woods Center, and Helen, Georgia. From there, US 129/SR 11 winds further and further northwest as it meanders through the farmlands at the foot of the North Georgia mountains, occasionally passing some camps of various types along the way.

As the route crosses the White-Lumpkin County Line, it enters the Chattahoochee-Oconee National Forest, and is given the name "Turners Corner Road," which somehow starts to curve southwest until it runs past a local convenience store and garage and runs west in front of them before curving northwest and encountering the intersection with US Route 19 in Turners Corner, which joins the routes in another concurrency. This is also a reunification, because US 129 actually begins at US 19 in Chiefland, Florida. The three routes climb over and descend the North Georgia mountains and continues north, just as US 129/SR 11 were already doing without US 19 with randomly located hill-climbing lanes. Along the way it passes by the Mountain View Campground and Trading Post. Other campgrounds include the Desoto Falls Recreation Area and the Chestatee Knoll Campground. Somewhere along the way, it gains the name "Gainesville Highway," where it winds around the east side of Blood Mountain. It also passes through a divide within the mountains known as Neels Gap along the Lumpkin-Union County Line, after which it passes by the Walasi-Yi Interpretive Center, which also contains the Appalachian Trail. A runaway truck ramp can be seen just before the entrance to Vogel State Park, which itself ran along the west side of US 19/129/SR 11 since the routes entered Union County. North of the park, Georgia State Route 180 (Wolf Pen Gap Road) joins this concurrency, where the routes encounter such sites as the Byron Herbert Reece Farm and Heritage Center, a local grocery store and a gift shop diagonally across from where SR 180 leaves the concurrency at Bald Mountain Road.

Eventually leaving the parkland US 129/19/SR 11 is surrounded by more farms and ranches, though still exists as a mountain road. In Owltown, random trading posts, flea markets and some restaurants are found along the road, one of which uses an oversized chair as a promotional tool. Some campgrounds still exist along this segment as well. Evidence that a more urban setting is to come can be found when the routes make a right turn at Glenn Gooch Bypass (doubling as Shoe Factory Road), while the name of the street formerly designated as US 19/129 changes to Cleveland Avenue. Still considered to be within parkland territory, US 19/129 climbs a hill with sparse mixed development. At a fork in the road, Shoe Factory Road branches off to the southeast, while the Glenn Gooch Bypass (Industrial Boulevard) curves left to the northeast. Descending along the hill, the road approaches an industrial park that also includes the Union County Sheriff's Office and the Colwell Probation Detention Center before curving to the northwest and passing by the Union County Department of Driver Services. Continuing to descend the hill, it intersects Roscoe Collins Drive and Panther Way, the former of which leads to Downtown Blairsville, and the latter of which leads to Union County High School. Glenn Gooch Bypass ends at US Route 76/SRs 2/515, but US 19/129/SR 11 makes a left turn at that route, joining it in another concurrency. From there, the routes run west along the northern edge of Blairsville, but after curving to the west-southwest passes under an interchange with Pat Haralson Memorial Drive, which leads to the Union County Courthouse, to the south and the Union General Hospital to the north. US 19/129/SR 11 make a right turn onto Murphy Highway while US 76/SRs 2/515 continues to the west, curving away from its former trajectory on Blue Ridge Highway.

Northwest from there, US 19/129/SR 11 passes the southwest border of the Butternut Creek Golf Course before entering Youngstown. The road turns north again where it utilizes a short causeway over Wellborn Branch, a tributary of the Nottely River before intersecting the northern terminus of Pat Haralson Memorial Drive, and across from this a local marina with a gas station/convenience store, small bait & tackle store and gift shop before the intersection with Pat Colwell Road. Random current and former boating and automotive-related businesses can be found along the way even as the road enters Canal Lake where another short causeway that makes a pond leading to Stevens Branch Creek, and is served by the Nottely Marina. Between an antique store and a furniture store, a power line right-of-way crosses from southeast to northwest as it heads over a mountain, and the road runs along the east side of that power line. Moving further away from those power lines, the road passes by a Cott Beverages production facility. A third causeway that creates a pond for Ivylog Creek, whereas further north a small culvert over Conley Creek is not used as a dam. Flashing lights on the top and bottom of the two signal crossing signs are an indication the routes are about to enter Ivylog where the eastern terminus of Georgia State Route 325 can be found across from Ivy Log Road. North of the heart of Ivy Log, the Ivy Log Cemetery can be found hidden away in a driveway among more residential zoning. The rest of the surroundings are primarily farm and ranch land even as it runs under another power line right-of-way running from southwest to northeast south of T Chapel Road. The last two intersections in the State of Georgia are local roads, the first named Tate Road and a dead-end street named B. King Lane which leads to an antique store. A gas station and strip mall can be found on the southwest corner of the North Carolina state line, where SR 11 meets its northern terminus, while US 19 continues towards Erie, Pennsylvania and US 129 continues towards Knoxville, Tennessee.

National Highway System
The following portions of US 129 in Georgia are part of the National Highway System, a system of routes determined to be the most important for the nation's economy, mobility, and defense:
From Ocilla to about Fitzgerald
From the southern end of the US 341 concurrency in Hawkinsville to the northern end of the US 41 concurrency and the southern end of the US 41 Bus. concurrency in the southern part of Macon
From the northern end of the US 41 Bus. concurrency in Macon to about Gray
From Eatonton to the North Carolina state line.

History

Major intersections

See also

Special routes of U.S. Route 129

References

External links

 Georgia @ SouthEastRoads - U.S. Highway 129
 129  US 129 (Georgia Highways)
 US 129 in Georgia (Mile by Mile)
 GDOT Official Website

 Georgia
29-1
Transportation in Echols County, Georgia
Transportation in Lanier County, Georgia
Transportation in Berrien County, Georgia
Transportation in Irwin County, Georgia
Transportation in Ben Hill County, Georgia
Transportation in Wilcox County, Georgia
Transportation in Pulaski County, Georgia
Transportation in Houston County, Georgia
Transportation in Bibb County, Georgia
Transportation in Macon, Georgia
Transportation in Jones County, Georgia
Transportation in Morgan County, Georgia
Transportation in Oconee County, Georgia
Transportation in Clarke County, Georgia
Transportation in Athens, Georgia
Transportation in Jackson County, Georgia
Gainesville, Georgia
Transportation in Hall County, Georgia
Transportation in White County, Georgia
Transportation in Lumpkin County, Georgia
Transportation in Union County, Georgia